Tropical Storm Marco was the smallest tropical cyclone on record by radius of winds from center. The thirteenth named storm of the 2008 Atlantic hurricane season, Marco developed out of a broad area of low pressure over the northwestern Caribbean during late September 2008. Influenced by a tropical wave on October 4, a small low-level circulation center developed over Belize. After crossing the southern end of the Yucatán Peninsula and emerging into the Bay of Campeche, the low was declared Tropical Depression Thirteen early on October 6. The depression quickly intensified into a tropical storm and was given the name Marco later that day. Marco reached its peak intensity with winds of 65 mph (100 km/h) early on October 7. Around this time, tropical storm force winds extended  from the center of the storm, making Marco the smallest tropical cyclone on record. Around 1200 UTC, Marco made landfall near Misantla, Veracruz. The storm rapidly weakened after landfall, dissipating later that day. 

Meteorological history

Tropical Storm Marco originated in a broad area of low pressure that persisted over the northwestern Caribbean in late September 2008. On October 4, a tropical wave reached the same area, and the system spawned a circulation center over Belize. Development of the low was initially inhibited by its proximity to land. As the system neared the Bay of Campeche, convection quickly developed around the low. At 00:00 UTC on October 6, the low was designated as Tropical Depression Thirteen while located over Laguna de Términos. A mid-level ridge located to the north of the depression led to movement in a general west-northwest direction. Forecasters anticipated intensification up until landfall because of the storm's well-developed outflow and the low wind shear and high sea surface temperatures in its path.

Favorable conditions for development allowed Marco to quickly intensify throughout the day on October 6. Following the quick increase in intensity, forecasters noted the possibility of Marco intensifying into a hurricane before making landfall. The storm maintained a small area of deep convection, averaging  in diameter, as it continued moving towards the west-northwest. Shortly after reaching peak intensity, tropical storm force winds extended  from the center of Marco. Once inland, Marco rapidly weakened, being downgraded to a tropical depression six hours after landfall. The small depression dissipated later that day over the mountains of Mexico.

Preparations, impact, and records

Upon the storm's formation, the Government of Mexico issued a tropical storm warning for the Gulf of Mexico from Tuxpan to Punta El Lagarto. That afternoon the government issued a hurricane watch between Cabo Rojo and Veracruz, and extended the tropical storm warning northward to Cabo Rojo. Officials closed schools ahead of the storm and opened 200 shelters. An estimated 3,000 people were evacuated from low-lying areas along the coast. Soldiers used school buses to transport evacuees to the shelters.  Marco formed in the area of Mexico's main oil-facilities, leading to the evacuation of 33 workers from four platforms. Six oil wells and a natural gas processing plant were also shut down in Veracruz. The Mexican Secretariat of Communications and Transportation also closed the ports of Nautla and Alvarado to small vessels as a precautionary measure.

The rains from Marco worsened flood situations in areas of Mexico already suffering from severe flooding. Officials in Veracruz, in their post-storm damage survey, reported that two rivers, the Quilate and Tenoch, overflowed their banks due to rains produced by Marco. One of these rivers left the towns of Minatitlan and Hidalgotitlan under 10 ft (3 m) of water. Highways along the coast of Veracruz were also flooded. Another 250 homes were flooded when a lake and a river overflowed their banks. Thirteen municipalities within Veracruz were affected by Marco. In Vega de Alatorre, 77 people were evacuated to nearby shelters after their homes were inundated with water. Three landslides were also reported in Misantla Colipa; none of them caused damage. In all, Marco's impact was light; minimal damage was recorded, and none of the estimated 400,000 people affected by the storm  sustained injury.

In the wake of Marco, the General Coordination of Civil Protection of the Ministry of the Interior declared a state of emergency for 48 municipalities in Veracruz. Relief goods were distributed to the affected areas by October 9. The Government of Mexico reported that 4,700 blankets, 2,900 mattresses, 5,554 bottles of water (each containing 500 milliliters), 260,000 boxes of milk, 250,000 packages of biscuits, and 12,400 boxes of school supplies had been distributed.

At 0052 UTC on October 7, tropical storm force winds extended  from the center of Marco. This made Marco the smallest tropical cyclone ever recorded, surpassing the previous record set on December 24, 1974 by Cyclone Tracy, whose  tropical storm-force winds extended .

See also

List of tropical cyclone records
Timeline of the 2008 Atlantic hurricane season
Typhoon Tip – Largest tropical cyclone on record
Cyclone Tracy – Previous record holder for the smallest tropical cyclone

References

External links

The National Hurricane Center's Advisory Archive for Tropical Storm Marco
National Weather Service Page on Tropical Cyclone Structure

2008 Atlantic hurricane season
2008 in Mexico
Atlantic hurricanes in Mexico
Atlantic tropical storms
Marco